Brownsville Township may refer to the following townships in the United States:

 Brownsville Township, Union County, Indiana
 Brownsville Township, Houston County, Minnesota
 Brownsville Township, Fayette County, Pennsylvania